is a Japanese football player. He plays for Azul Claro Numazu.

Career 
After graduating from Kwansei Gakuin University, he joined Albirex Niigata Singapore of Singapore's S.League. He played 25 games and scored two goals in two seasons from 2005 to 2006.  He moved to Vejle Boldklub in 2007.  On 18 January 2009, he signed with FC Gifu.  On 25 January 2013, he signed with Osotsapa in the Thai Premier League.  In December 2013, he signed with Bangkok F.C. in the Thai Division 1 League.

Honours

Club
Vejle Boldklub
 Danish 1st Division Champions (1) : 2007-08

References

External links

Vejle Boldklub profile
World Soccer Stats on Suguru
ssballthai.com

1982 births
Living people
Kwansei Gakuin University alumni
Association football people from Hyōgo Prefecture
Japanese footballers
Singapore Premier League players
Danish Superliga players
J2 League players
Japan Football League players
Suguru Hashimoto
Suguru Hashimoto
Albirex Niigata Singapore FC players
Vejle Boldklub players
FC Gifu players
Suguru Hashimoto
Suguru Hashimoto
Azul Claro Numazu players
Japanese expatriate footballers
Japanese expatriate sportspeople in Singapore
Expatriate footballers in Singapore
Expatriate men's footballers in Denmark
Japanese expatriate sportspeople in Thailand
Expatriate footballers in Thailand
Association football midfielders